Martin Volmer Jervan (13 May 1891 Tallinn – 15 October 1942, Chelyabinsk) was an Estonian Major General and medical doctor. He served as head of the Estonian Army medical service from 1935 until the Soviet occupation in 1940. After Estonia was incorporated into the Soviet Union on 6 August 1940 as the Estonian SSR and the Estonian Army was reorganized as the 22nd Estonian Territorial Rifle Corps of the Red Army, Jervan served as the chief of the medical service of the 22nd Rifle Corps.

On 8 March 1941 Jervan was arrested, deported and subsequently executed in Chelyabinsk prison camp.

References 

Generals.dk

1891 births
1942 deaths
People from Tallinn
People from Kreis Harrien
Estonian major generals
Soviet major generals
Estonian military doctors
Imperial Russian Army officers
University of Tartu alumni
Russian military personnel of World War I
Estonian military personnel of the Estonian War of Independence
Recipients of the Cross of Liberty (Estonia)
Recipients of the Military Order of the Cross of the Eagle, Class II
Recipients of the Military Order of the Cross of the Eagle, Class III
Estonian people executed by the Soviet Union